The Penticton Lakers were a junior 'B' Ice Hockey team based in Penticton, British Columbia, Canada. They were members of the Okanagan Division of the Okanagan/Shuswap of the Kootenay International Junior Hockey League (KIJHL) and were part of the Okanagan Hockey Academy. They played their home games at the South Okanagan Events Centre. They were last coached by Robert Dirk.

The Lakers were relocated to 100 Mile House prior to the start of the 2013-14 KIJHL season due to arena difficulties and poor attendance, largely to blame on superior competition from the Junior A Penticton Vees, and were renamed as the 100 Mile House Wranglers.

Season-by-season record

Note: GP = Games played, W = Wins, L = Losses, T = Ties, OTL = Overtime Losses, Pts = Points, GF = Goals for, GA = Goals against

Records as of February 19, 2012.

Playoffs

Records as of March 4, 2012.

Awards and trophies
Rookie of the Year
Devon Krogh: 2006-2007Most Sportsmanlike
Thomas Simkins: 2004-2005

References

External links
Official website of the Penticton Lakers

Ice hockey teams in British Columbia
Sport in Penticton
2009 establishments in British Columbia
Ice hockey clubs established in 2009
2013 disestablishments in British Columbia
Ice hockey clubs disestablished in 2013